Country Fair may refer to:
Country Fair (film), a 1941 American film by Frank McDonald 
Song of the Plough or Country Fair, a 1933 British film
Agricultural show or country fair
Country Fair, a convenience store chain owned by United Refining Company

See also
County Fair (disambiguation)
Oregon Country Fair